Diogo Soares de Albergaria, also known as Diego Soares de Melo, Diego Suarez de Melo and the "Galego", was a 16th-century Portuguese navigator and explorer.

India
Soares arrived to India  1538, where he was a known murderer and pirate. Estêvão da Gama, by then Governor of Goa, issued a warrant for Soares's arrest, but Soares was later granted a pardon by Da Gama's successor, Martim Afonso de Sousa, who was a friend of Soares. Under De Sousa's rule, Soares commanded expeditions while at the same time continuing his pirate activities near Portuguese Mozambique.

Madagascar 
Soares visited Madagascar in 1543 under the orders of Martim Afonso de Sousa, to investigate the whereabouts of De Sousa's brother who was reportedly wrecked there. The same year, Soares returned to Kochi (the Cochin) without the information, but with loads of silver and slaves he had looted from the island.

The northern coastal town of Antsiranana was probably named after Soares. Until 1975, the town was known by Spanish form of Soares's name, Diego Suárez. The large natural bay along the northeast coast of Madagascar is also named Diego Suarez Bay.

Burma

Soares landed in Portuguese Malacca in 1547, driven by the weather. There he stayed under the orders of Tabinshwehti, King of the Burmese of the Toungoo dynasty. There, Soares became wealthy, worth four million in jewels and other valuables, had a pension of 200,000 ducats yearly, was called the king's brother, and was supreme governor of the kingdom and general in chief of the army.

Burmese–Siamese War (1548)

During the Burmese–Siamese War (1547–1549), Soares commanded a force of five captains and 180 professional mercenaries, he also led the failed invasion and siege of Tapuram, which ended after five months after 120,000 Peguans deserted when their leader Xemindoo (Smim Htaw) rebelled in their native Pegu, but also as a revenge for the mistreatment by Soares, who was his general in chief.

Death

While still King Tabinshwehti's general, Soares tried to take off by force the daughter of a rich merchant, in the process he killed the groom and others who came to her rescue, and the bride committed suicide to avoid the dishonour. Soon afterwards, the King was killed and replaced by one of his generals called Zemin (Smim Sawhtut), who eventually handed Soares to the city of the disgraced bride, there the people stoned Soares to death, plundered his house, and as much less treasure was found, he was believed to have buried the rest. The episode of his death is described in the book Peregrinação by Fernão Mendes Pinto.

In 1963, botanist René Paul Raymond Capuron published a genus of flowering plants belonging to the family Bixaceae, from Madagascar as Diegodendron and named in his honour and due to his links with the island.

See also
 Burmese–Siamese War (1547–49)

Notes

References

 

 

 

 

16th-century explorers
16th-century Portuguese people
Explorers of Africa
Portuguese explorers
Portuguese navigators
Maritime history of Portugal